Alexander Douglas McCartney (14 November 1879 – 21 July 1968) was an Irish international footballer, active in both Ireland and England, who played as a full back.

Career
Born in the Ballynafeigh district of Belfast, McCartney played youth football with Rosetta National School, Ferndale of the Belfast Alliance League, and then Hatfield, before beginning his senior career in 1900 with Distillery. McCartney later played for Ulster and Linfield before moving to England to join Everton, where he spent a single season without making a League appearance. He moved to West Ham United, along with Everton teammate George Kitchen, in the summer of 1905 and played six Southern League Division One games for the club during 1905–06.

After leaving West Ham, McCartney returned to Ireland and played for Belfast Celtic and Glentoran, before returning to Linfield.

McCartney earned fifteen caps for Ireland between 1903 and 1909.

References

1879 births
1968 deaths
Association footballers from Belfast
Irish association footballers (before 1923)
Pre-1950 IFA international footballers
Lisburn Distillery F.C. players
Ulster F.C. players
Linfield F.C. players
Everton F.C. players
West Ham United F.C. players
Belfast Celtic F.C. players
Glentoran F.C. players
Association football fullbacks